Magazyn Wileński (Polish: Vilnius Journal) is a Polish-language monthly political and cultural magazine based in Lithuania. In 2005 it was one of four Polish-language print publications in the country.

History and profile
Magazyn Wileński was established in 1990, and the first issue appeared on 6 January. The founders were Michał Mackiewicz and Jan Sienkiewicz.

Its headquarters is in Vilnius. The magazine is published by the Union of Poles on a monthly basis. In the first six years Magazyn Wileński was a biweekly publication. In 1996 its publication frequency was made monthly.

References

External links

1990 establishments in Lithuania
Biweekly magazines
Cultural magazines
Magazines established in 1990
Mass media in Vilnius
Monthly magazines
Polish-language magazines published in Lithuania
Political magazines